Barry Mitchelson (born c. 1942) is a retired Canadian football player who played for the Edmonton Eskimos and Toronto Argonauts. He played college football at the University of Western Ontario.

Mitchelson was a member of the Board of Directors for Calgary Olympic Organizing Committee of the 1988 Winter Olympics.

References

1940s births
Living people
Canadian football ends
Canadian football placekickers
Edmonton Elks players
Toronto Argonauts players
Western Mustangs football players